The 2010–11 season was the 106th season of competitive football in Turkey.

League tables

Süper Lig

1.Lig

Turkish Cup

Teams seeded for the group stages: Trabzonspor (defending champions), Bursaspor (1st in the Süper Lig), Fenerbahçe (2nd), and Galatasaray (3rd).
Teams seeded for the play-off round: Beşiktaş (4th in the Süper Lig), İstanbul B.B. (6th), Eskişehirspor (7th), Kayserispor (8th), Antalyaspor (9th), Gençlerbirliği (10th), Kasımpaşa (11th), Ankaragücü (12th), Gaziantepspor (13th), Manisaspor (14th), Sivasspor (15th), Karabükspor (1.Lig champions), Bucaspor (1.Lig runners-up), and Konyaspor (promoted from the 1.Lig)
Teams seeded for the second round: Diyarbakırspor (16th in the Süper Lig), Denizlispor (17th), Adanaspor (3rd in the 1.Lig), Altay (4th), Karşıyaka (5th), Giresunspor (7th), Orduspor (8th), Boluspor (9th), Samsunspor (10th), Kayseri Erciyesspor (11th), Gaziantep B.B. (12th), Mersin İdmanyurdu (13th), Kartalspor (14th), Çaykur Rizespor (15th)

National team

Friendlies

Euro 2012 qualification

References

 
Seasons in Turkish football
Turkish 2010